Oneida Valley is a hamlet in the Town of Lenox in Madison County, New York. It is located east of South Bay at the corner of New York State Route 31 (NY 31) and NY 316.

References

Geography of Madison County, New York
Hamlets in Madison County, New York